Rađenović is a Serbian surname, a patronymic derived from Slavic given name Rađen. It may refer to:

Vuk Rađenović
Dejan Rađenović, Serbian footballer
Zdravko Rađenović (born 1952), retired Yugoslav and Serbian handballer
Goran Rađenović (born 1966), retired Yugoslav and Serbian water polo player

Serbian surnames